Lumibrite (SrAl2O4 + Eu + Dy - Strontium aluminate doped with Europium and Dysprosium) is a luminous paint used on some models of Seiko, Citizen, Lorus, and Pulsar watches.

This is a new (in 1995) kind of luminescent paint that glows brighter for longer than the previous generation of luminescent paints, and is environmentally friendly (non radioactive).

See also
Luminous paint
Super-LumiNova

References

Brand name materials